Bacillus atrophaeus is a species of black-pigmented bacteria. Its type strain is NRRL NRS-213.  B. atrophaeus strains have been used extensively in biomedicine as indicator strains for heat- and chemical-based decontamination regimens. Most of the strains in use are derivatives of a lineage of B. atrophaeus that originated at Camp Detrick in the 1950s, where many modern biocontainment procedures were developed. B. atrophaeus has historically been known by several other names, including B. globigii (the origin of its military moniker "BG") and B. subtilis var. niger. Modern phylogenetic analyses using multiple genetic methods have placed B. atrophaeus close to B. subtilis. Its original and still most prominent use is as a surrogate organism for pathogenic B. anthracis, beginning in the U.S. bio-weapons program, as its pigmentation readily facilitated discrimination from non-pigmented background organisms in environmental samples.
Subsequent genomic and phenotypic analysis of strains derived from the Camp Detrick isolates revealed that they had been deliberately selected for strains that exhibited elevated rates of sporulation.

References

Further reading
Fritze, Dagmar, and Rüdiger Pukall. "Reclassification of bioindicator strains Bacillus subtilis DSM 675 and Bacillus subtilis DSM 2277 as Bacillus atrophaeus". International Journal of Systematic and Evolutionary Microbiology51.1 (2001): 35–37.
Youssef, Nabil N., and Joyce Knoblett. "Culture filtrate of Bacillus atrophaeus induced abnormalities in Ascosphaera apis". Mycologia (1998): 937–946.

Luftman, Henry S., and Michael A. Regits. "B. Atrophaeus and G. Stearothermophilus biological indicators for chlorine dioxide gas decontamination". Applied Biosafety: Journal of the American Biological Safety Association 13.3 (2008): 143–157.

External links

LPSN
Type strain of Bacillus atrophaeus at BacDive -  the Bacterial Diversity Metadatabase

atrophaeus
Bacteria described in 1989